Kevin Andrew Maher (born 17 October 1976) is a former professional footballer and coach who played as a midfielder. He is head coach of National League side Southend United. Born in England, he represented the Republic of Ireland internationally at youth levels U17 and U21.

Club career

Southend United 
After beginning his career with Tottenham Hotspur, Maher moved to Southend United on a free transfer on 23 January 1998. He quickly broke into the first team, making 18 appearances for the first-team that season. During the 1998–99 season, Maher scored his first career goal in a 1–1 draw with Rochdale.

Over the next ten years Maher was a virtual ever-present for Southend, rising to be team captain and subsequently club captain. During this time he made more than 400 appearances for the club, and captained Southend to promotion twice, from League Two to the Championship, in successive seasons.

When, during the 2007–08 season it became clear that Maher was no longer an automatic first choice he chose to look for opportunities elsewhere. He left Southend just before he would have become entitled to a testimonial, to join fellow League One side, Gillingham, on loan for the remainder of the season. In his two months with the Kent club, he made seven total appearances but did not score a goal.

Oldham Athletic 
In the summer of 2008, Maher joined Oldham Athletic after he was released by Southend, despite the confidence from Gillingham that he would sign with their club. He immediately signed a one-year contract with the club. On 9 August, he made his debut for Oldham in a 4–3 comeback victory versus Millwall. He later scored his first goal for Oldham on 14 March 2009 versus Milton Keynes Dons. In the 4th minute, he scored from a free kick to give Oldham a 1–0 lead, though the team lost the game 6–2. On 13 May, under new manager Dave Penney, Maher's contract was not renewed, resulting in his release from the club.

Gillingham 
In June 2009, he joined Gillingham on a two-year deal.

Dagenham & Redbridge 
In August 2011 Maher signed for Dagenham & Redbridge. On 7 May 2013, he was released by the Daggers due to the expiry of his contract.

International career 
Born in England, Maher was eligible to play for the Republic of Ireland national team, and made four appearances for the Republic of Ireland U21 national team.

Coaching career 
In June 2014 Maher was appointed head coach of Chelmsford City. On 14 February 2015, Maher was an unused substitute in the Clarets' 2–0 defeat to Maidenhead United.

In October 2015 Maher returned to Southend in a coaching capacity, assisting the under 21 and youth teams at the club and at the end of November 2015, he was appointed U21 manager of the club. On 20 January 2016, Maher was named as Chelmsford City's caretaker manager after previous manager Mark Hawkes left the club, On 26 February 2016, Maher was appointed Chelmsford City manager until the end of the season, before being replaced by Rod Stringer during the summer break.

Bristol Rovers
In July 2019, Maher left his position at Southend and joined Bristol Rovers as a first team coach. Following the departure of manager Graham Coughlan, followed by caretaker manager Joe Dunne, Maher was placed in temporary charge of Bristol Rovers, overseeing a 0–0 draw with Peterborough United before Ben Garner was appointed as permanent manager. In January 2020, Maher was again placed in charge of the first-team after manager Garner was granted a period of extended leave for personal reasons.

Southend United
On 20 October 2021, Maher returned to Southend United, now in the National League, in the role of head coach, replacing Phil Brown. Darren Currie joined him as his assistant and former Southend teammate Mark Bentley joined as first team coach. His opening match as manager ended in disappointment as he saw his side fall to a 3–0 defeat at fifth-placed Dagenham & Redbridge as the hosts scored three goals in six minutes. Maher got a first win in his third game for the club when his side beat bottom side Dover Athletic 4–1 to move out of the relegation zone.

Despite ongoing difficulties off the field, Maher ensured that his side maintained their impressive form. Following five wins from six matches, he was awarded the National League Manager of the Month award for February 2023 with Southend sitting in the play-off positions.

Career statistics

Managerial statistics

Honours 
Southend United
 Football League Two Play-off Winner: 2004–05
 Football League One Champion: 2005–06
Individual

 PFA Team of the Year: League One (2005–06), League Two (2004–05)
 Southend United Player of the Season: 2000–01, 2006–07

References

External links 
 

1976 births
Living people
Footballers from Ilford
Republic of Ireland association footballers
Republic of Ireland under-21 international footballers
Republic of Ireland B international footballers
Republic of Ireland youth international footballers
English footballers
Association football midfielders
Tottenham Hotspur F.C. players
Southend United F.C. players
Gillingham F.C. players
Oldham Athletic A.F.C. players
Dagenham & Redbridge F.C. players
Bray Wanderers F.C. players
Whitehawk F.C. players
English Football League players
National League (English football) players
League of Ireland players
Chelmsford City F.C. managers
Chelmsford City F.C. players
English football managers
Southend United F.C. non-playing staff
Chelmsford City F.C. non-playing staff
Association football coaches
Bristol Rovers F.C. managers
Bristol Rovers F.C. non-playing staff
Southend United F.C. managers